Melrose is a suburb of Wellington,  New Zealand. It is south of the city centre, Berhampore and Newtown, and is in the Eastern Ward. Although adjacent to Lyall Bay, it does not have seafront access to the bay.

History  
In 1879 the Melrose Estate was put up for auction. The land had belonged to Alexander Sutherland who died in 1877, and was sold to Mace and Jackson and then a syndicate known as Melrose Proprietors. Like James Coutts Crawford's subdivision of the Seatoun township on the Miramar Peninsula, there were few buyers because of difficult access. Crawford's earlier auction of Kilbirnie sections in 1874 had attracted mainly speculators buying cheap land rather than would-be homeowners. 

The Melrose Borough was established in 1888 from the earlier Kilbirnie Road Board, to serve a horseshoe-shaped and largely rural area stretching from Upland Farm (later Kelburn) through Brooklyn and Island Bay and to areas later called Haitaitai and Roseneath. Initially it was to be called the Borough of Southend.

The borough experienced rapid growth from the early 1890s, mainly in Kilbirnie, Brooklyn and Island Bay. Amalgamation with Wellington City would avoid large borough debt for amenities like drainage, water supply and a separate electric tramway system. Wellington City was planning an  electric tramway system to replace the private horse tramways, and purchased them in 1902 (the first electric line was opened in 1904). 

In June 1902 a poll of Melrose residents agreed to join the Wellington City Council, and amalgamation proceeded in 1903. Extension of new electric tramway to the area plus water supply and sewerage was promised within three years, although held up by Island Bay "malcontents" wanting a firm commitment of a tramway extension to Island Bay.

There was a "boom" in house construction in Melrose and Kilbirnie in 1907.

In 2013 the population reached 1,215 in the  land area.  

The Wellington ward boundaries split Melrose between the Motukairangi/Eastern Ward and the Paekawakawa/ Southern Ward.

Demographics 

Melrose had a population of 1,299 at the 2018 New Zealand census, an increase of 87 people (7.2%) since the 2013 census, and an increase of 117 people (9.9%) since the 2006 census. There were 492 households. There were 660 males and 642 females, giving a sex ratio of 1.03 males per female. The median age was 35.2 years (compared with 37.4 years nationally), with 204 people (15.7%) aged under 15 years, 315 (24.2%) aged 15 to 29, 687 (52.9%) aged 30 to 64, and 93 (7.2%) aged 65 or older.

Ethnicities were 85.9% European/Pākehā, 9.2% Māori, 5.5% Pacific peoples, 7.2% Asian, and 3.9% other ethnicities (totals add to more than 100% since people could identify with multiple ethnicities).

The proportion of people born overseas was 30.0%, compared with 27.1% nationally.

Although some people objected to giving their religion, 64.9% had no religion, 23.1% were Christian, 1.6% were Hindu, 0.9% were Muslim, 0.9% were Buddhist and 3.2% had other religions.

Of those at least 15 years old, 543 (49.6%) people had a bachelor or higher degree, and 60 (5.5%) people had no formal qualifications. The median income was $46,900, compared with $31,800 nationally. The employment status of those at least 15 was that 690 (63.0%) people were employed full-time, 165 (15.1%) were part-time, and 39 (3.6%) were unemployed.

Notable Features

Mount Albert 
Mount Albert serves as a water distribution location to the surrounding suburbs from the Mt Albert reservoir.  In 2016 the original 1910 810 litre tank was replaced with a 2.2 million litre tank built underground beside another above ground tank built in 1955. 

The Wellington town belt reserve runs along the top of Melrose, backing on to the Wellington Zoological gardens. Mt Albert is part of this reserve and includes biking and walking opportunities along the Southern walkway.  There is an off-leash dog exercise area part way up Mt Albert and a specialised mountain biking track has been built in the reserve by local volunteers.

Melrose Park 
Melrose Park is located on Sutherland Crescent. Football is played here, there is an artificial surface for cricket and the park also contains a playground and changing rooms.

Truby King House 

Truby King Park is off Manchester Street in Melrose, the homestead is now managed by Wellington City Council but was previously home to the founder of the Plunket Society and features many plaques and memorials to the work Sir Truby King and his wife Lady Isabella King undertook.  Both are interred at a mausoleum on the  site.

Activities 
The Melrose suburb is part of the Predator Free Lyall Bay, Rongatai and Melrose group.  Through backyard trapping, this group aims to help New Zealand native species become reestablished within Wellington.

External links

References

Further reading  

Suburbs of Wellington City